María del Carmen Borrego Campos (Málaga, 30 October 1966), better known as Carmen Borrego, is a Spanish television program director and collaborator. She is the daughter of journalist María Teresa Campos  and the sister of the presenter, Terelu Campos.

Biography 
María del Carmen was born on 30 October 1966. She is the youngest daughter of late journalist José María Borrego Doblas and journalist María Teresa Campos Luque. She is the younger sister of television presenter Terelu Campos. Her first job was in radio, at Cadena SER, where she worked as a producer with Iñaki Gabilondo. Later, she jumped to television, working for nine years on the news programs of the pay channel Canal+.

In 1996, she became assistant director of the Telecinco program Día a día, until 2004. Subsequently, she moved to Antena 3 with Cada día presented by her mother, María Teresa Campos, until 2005. She has continued to direct in autonomous programs such as Cerca de ti and A tu vera since that year.

In 2016, she became mostly known thanks to her participation as the protagonist, along with her mother and sister, in the docu reality Las Campos, a production of La Fábrica de la Tele that aired on Telecinco between 2016 and 2018. She has since appeared in several Mediaset programs, including Sálvame, Sábado Deluxe, Mujeres y hombres y viceversa, El debate de Supervivientes and Viva la vida, in addition to being a contestant (and winner) of Ven a cenar conmigo: Gourmet edition (in which she competes with El Dioni, Víctor Sandoval and Bibiana Fernández. She has also served on the jury for the program A tu vera mini.

In 2020, she debuted as an actress in the Atresplayer TV series Veneno, where she plays a TV collaborator in one episode.

In 2021, Carmen returned to the program Sálvame, becoming, together with the model Alba Carrillo, the new incorporation.

Private life 
In 1989 she married sound technician Francisco Almoguera Haro, with whom she had two children, José María, born in 1990, and Carmen Rosa, born in 1993. After seven years of marriage, the couple divorced.

On 18 July 2014, she married businessman José Carlos Bernal Zamorano, whom she met while working at Canal Sur.

Trajectory

Television programs 

 As a director

 As a collaborator

Television series

References

External links 
 Carmen Borrego on Instagram

1966 births
Living people
Spanish television directors
Spanish television actresses
Spanish television personalities
Spanish radio actresses